The 1980 NCAA Men's Division I Swimming and Diving Championships were contested in March 1980 at Blodgett Pool at Harvard University in Cambridge, Massachusetts at the 57th annual NCAA-sanctioned swim meet to determine the team and individual national champions of Division I men's collegiate swimming and diving in the United States. 

California again topped the team standings, the Golden Bears' second consecutive and second overall title.

Team standings
Note: Top 10 only
(H) = Hosts
(DC) = Defending champions
Full results

See also
List of college swimming and diving teams

References

NCAA Division I Men's Swimming and Diving Championships
NCAA Division I Swimming And Diving Championships
NCAA Division I Swimming And Diving Championships
NCAA Division I Swimming And Diving Championships